The men's foil was a fencing event held as part of the Fencing at the 1920 Summer Olympics programme. It was the fifth appearance of the event. A total of 56 fencers from 10 nations competed in the event, which was held on August 17 and August 18, 1920. Nations were limited to eight fencers each, with Belgium and Italy entering the maximum. Nedo Nadi of Italy repeated as Olympic champion, retaining the title he initially won at the 1912 Summer Olympics. Philippe Cattiau and Roger Ducret of France earned silver and bronze, respectively, returning France to the podium for the first time since 1900.

Background

This was the fifth appearance of the event, which has been held at every Summer Olympics except 1908 (when there was a foil display only rather than a medal event). Four of the 1912 finalists returned after the war: gold medalist Nedo Nadi and silver medalist Pietro Speciale of Italy and sixth-place finisher Edgar Seligman and eighth-place finisher Robert Montgomerie of Great Britain.

Czechoslovakia and Egypt each made their debut in the men's foil. The United States made its fourth appearance, having missed only the inaugural 1896 competition. France, a perennial power in the event, returned after not traveling to St. Louis in 1904 and boycotting the 1912 fencing competitions over rules disputes.

Competition format

The event used a three-round format. In each round, the fencers were divided into pools to play a round-robin within the pool. Bouts were to three touches (an unpopular change from the more typical five). Standard foil rules were used, including that touches had to be made with the tip of the foil, the target area was limited to the torso, and priority determined the winner of double touches.
 Quarterfinals: There were 8 pools of between 5 and 9 fencers each. The top 3 fencers in each quarterfinal advanced to the semifinals.
 Semifinals: There were 4 pools of 6 fencers each. The top 3 fencers in each semifinal advanced to the final.
 Final: The final pool had 12 fencers.

Schedule

Results

Quarterfinals

Quarterfinal A

Quarterfinal B

Quarterfinal C

Quarterfinal D

Quarterfinal E

Quarterfinal F

Quarterfinal G

Quarterfinal H

Semifinals

Semifinal A

Semifinal B

Semifinal C

Semifinal D

Final

References

 
 

Fencing at the 1920 Summer Olympics